Pilophorus walshii is a species of plant bug in the family Miridae. It is found in North America.

References

 Schuh, Randall T., and Michael D. Schwartz (1988). "Revision of the New World Pilophorini (Heteroptera: Miridae: Phylinae)". Bulletin of the American Museum of Natural History, vol. 187, art. 2, 101-201.
 Thomas J. Henry, Richard C. Froeschner. (1988). Catalog of the Heteroptera, True Bugs of Canada and the Continental United States. Brill Academic Publishers.

Further reading

 

Pilophorus (bug)
Insects described in 1887